Sean King (born 28 June 1964) is a former Australian rules footballer who played for the West Coast Eagles in the Victorian Football League (VFL).

King was an inaugural squad member of the West Coast Eagles but only made one appearance. It came in the final round of the season, against St Kilda at Subiaco, with King contributing two goals and 21 disposals to the win. Just like his West Perth teammate Paul Mifka who shared a debut with him that day, King wasn't picked again. At the Adelaide Bicentennial Carnival the following season, King represented the Australian Amateurs team.

The Western Australian is good friends with Dean Laidley and was best man at his wedding.

References

Holmesby, Russell and Main, Jim (2007). The Encyclopedia of AFL Footballers. 7th ed. Melbourne: Bas Publishing.

1964 births
Living people
West Coast Eagles players
West Perth Football Club players
Australian rules footballers from Western Australia